Franklin (Frank) William Stahl (born October 8, 1929) is an American molecular biologist and geneticist. With Matthew Meselson, Stahl conducted the famous Meselson-Stahl experiment showing that DNA is replicated by a semiconservative mechanism, meaning that each strand of the DNA serves as a template for production of a new strand.

He is Emeritus Professor of Biology at the University of Oregon's Institute of Molecular Biology in Eugene, Oregon.

Career
Stahl, like his two older sisters, graduated from the public schools of Needham, a Boston suburb. In 1951, he was awarded an AB degree in biology from Harvard College, and matriculated in the biology department of the University of Rochester. His interest in genetics was cemented in 1952 by his introduction to bacterial viruses (phages) in a course taught by A. H. (Gus) Doermann at the Cold Spring Harbor Biological Laboratory. In 1956, he received a PhD in biology for his work with Doermann on the genetics of T4 phage. In 1955, he undertook postdoctoral studies with Giuseppe Bertani (in the Phage group) at Caltech (Pasadena) with the aim of learning some bacterial genetics. He subsequently turned his attentions to collaborations with Charley Steinberg and Matt Meselson. With Steinberg, he undertook mathematical analyses of T4 growth, mutation, and genetic recombination. With Meselson, he studied DNA replication in Escherichia coli. That study produced strong support for the semiconservative model proposed by Jim Watson and Francis Crick.
	
For one year, Stahl served on the zoology faculty at the University of Missouri in Columbia, Missouri before accepting, in 1959, a position in the new Institute of Molecular Biology at the University of Oregon in Eugene. In the succeeding years, his research involved the phages T4 and Lambda and the budding yeast, Saccharomyces cerevisiae, with his primary focus on genetic recombination. He taught various genetics courses at Oregon and presented phage courses in America, Italy and India. He undertook sabbatical studies in Cambridge, UK, Edinburgh, Jerusalem, and Cambridge, Massachusetts.

Stahl's research was undertaken in association with numerous colleagues, especially his long-term associates Jean M. Crasemann (1921–1992), Mary M. Stahl (1935–1996), and Henriette (Jette) M. Foss (1937–date). Since his retirement in 2001, he lives with Jette and four llamas in Eugene, where he continues to submit research papers and participates in University of Oregon governance.

Personal life
Stahl and his wife Mary (married in 1955) raised two boys and a girl. Surviving are Andy Stahl, a forester and political activist, and Emily Morgan, a hairdresser and shop owner. With his partner, Jette, he shares five children (plus spouses) and eight grandchildren, of whom five are adopted.

Experimental contributions
In bacteria:
With M. Meselson, the demonstration of semiconservative DNA replication.
In phage T4: 
With H. Foss and others, demonstrations of genetic linkage circularity and its relation to genetic heterozygosis.
With N. Murray and others, the determination, by genetic methods, of the direction of mRNA synthesis on cotranscribed pairs of genes.
In Lambda:
With M. Stahl and others, the discovery and analysis of the genetic element, Chi, that stimulates nearby genetic recombination in bacteria.
With M. Stahl and others, the mutual dependence of DNA replication and genetic recombination. These studies utilized the method of density gradient centrifugation that was developed for the test of the semiconservative model of DNA replication.
In Yeast:
With H. Foss and others, the demonstration of two functional pathways for genetic recombination in wild-type budding yeast.

Theoretical contributions
With C. Steinberg, formulations of phage growth, recombination and mutation.
With J. Szostak and others, the interpretation of genetic recombination in terms of the repair of double-strand DNA breaks.
With R. Lande, E. Housworth and others, mathematical formalizations of recombination in higher organisms.

Selected honors
1997- 			Fellow, American Academy of Microbiology

1996 			Thomas Hunt Morgan Medal (from Genetics Society of America)

1986- 			Associate Member EMBO

1985- 			American Cancer Society Research Professor

1985-1990		MacArthur Fellow

1981-	 		Member, American Academy of Arts and Sciences

1976- 			Member, National Academy of Sciences

1975-76; 1985-1986	 	Guggenheim Fellow

1969-70		NIH Special Postdoctoral Fellowship

Honorary Doctor of Science: Oakland University and University of Rochester

References

External links
 Franklin Stahl in the Encyclopædia Britannica
 Franklin Stahl at DNAi.org
 Franklin Stahl at the University of Oregon
 Animation of the Meselson-Stahl Experiment from the Dolan DNA Learning Center
 Description of the Meselson-Stahl Experiment written by Nathan H. Lents, including original data from Visionlearning

1929 births
Members of the United States National Academy of Sciences
Living people
American molecular biologists
History of genetics
MacArthur Fellows
Phage workers
University of Oregon faculty
University of Missouri faculty
American biochemists
Harvard College alumni
University of Rochester alumni